Mugi the Cat (むぎ(猫)) is a Japanese singer-songwriter. His main instrument is the Xylophone. Born in Tokyo, he now lives in Uruma City, Okinawa, Japan.

History

Pre-music 
The artist Mugi the Cat was created by Yusaku, in memory of his real cat that lived from 1997 to 2009. As a reference, Mugi carries the sub-title "The Cat which came back from Heaven".
In 2014, he made his first appearance in his current form.

Initially, he had no plans to become a musician. He only wanted to go for walks and say hello to several people. But soon, he became popular on Twitter and was invited to events related to cats. Soon after, he started performing music, singing, talking, and dancing to entertain his fans.

Being a musician 
Mugi's music career started with performances at events and festivals, including those with an international audience. In 2017, he was the first cat to ever play at the Fuji Rock Festival. Other festival appearances include Rising Sun Rock Festival, Wild Bunch Festival, and Matsumoto Ringo Festival.

2017 Oct.: joined SPEEDSTAR MUSIC
2019 March: major debut album on SPEEDSTAR RECORDS, "君に会いに"
2019 March: launch of official fan club "Hachiware-Tengoku" 
2019 June/July: first nationwide tour in Japan 
2019 April: started hosting the radio show "blanks", weekly on FM Okinawa

Music

Creating music 
Mugi writes and records his music at home, including playing the piano, the xylophone, and the drums.
The guitar parts are played by his friend Satoshi (新垣智), who can also frequently be seen in the short films used during the live shows. 
Mugi's music includes many different genres, like pop, rock, hip-hop, etc.
Most songs are about a cat's view of the world. All songs are suitable for children, but not made for children. The lyrics are simple at first glance but meaningful when looking deeper and include many wordplays. 
Mugi is an advocate for kindness and peace, which is also reflected in his songs.
The pose he often takes after finishing a song (see photo) is a tribute to the peace statue in Nagasaki Peace Park.

Live performances 
During the live performances, Mugi sings and plays the Xylophone, sometimes also an Eisa drum. The rest of the music comes from the sound system.
He uses a lot of homemade accessories to underline his songs and is also dancing to most of the songs.
During the break in case of long concerts, homemade short films are played.
After many concerts, Mugi takes the time to say hello to his fans, have photos taken, and give signatures.

Appearance on national TV

Coverage in print media

Discography

Albums 
『天国かもしれない』 （2017）
『君に会いに』 （2019、limited edition CD+DVD: VIZL-1547、regular edition CD: VICL-65132）

EPs 
『ねっこほって e.p.』（2019、Limited edition CD+DVD+plush-keyholder: VIZL-1666、Regular edition CD: VICL-65266）
『窓辺の猫 e.p.』（2020、Limited edition special packaging: VICL-65414、Regular edition CD: VICL-65415）

Guest appearance 
Schroeder-Headz 『ゲスト・スイート』（2019、VICL-65267）「Surface」

References

External links 
 Mugi the Cat official website

Living people
J-pop musicians
Cat artists
Japanese singer-songwriters
Xylophonists
Year of birth missing (living people)